Cassinia furtiva is a species of flowering plant in the family Asteraceae and is endemic to a restricted area of New South Wales. It is a shrub with hairy, sticky stems, narrow linear leaves and 100 to 150 flower heads arranged in a rounded dichasium.

Description
The upper surface of the leaves is glabrous and the lower surface of the leaves is densely covered with cottony white hairs. The flower heads are arranged in a dichasium of 100 to 150, each head with five florets surrounded by overlapping membranous involucral bracts in two or three whorls.

Taxonomy and naming
The specific epithet (furtiva) means "hidden" or "elusive", referring to the lack of success in rediscovering this species after its discovery.

Distribution and habitat
This species of Cassinia is only known from the type specimen that was growing in shrubby woodland in hilly country.

References

furtiva
Asterales of Australia
Flora of New South Wales
Plants described in 2006